Maharashtra National Law University Nagpur (MNLU) (also known as National Law University, Nagpur or NLU Nagpur) is a National Law University and a public law school established by the government through the Maharashtra National Law University Act (Maharashtra Act No. VI of 2014). The university is the 19th National Law University established in India and is located in the Orange City of Nagpur, Maharashtra. The Chief Justice of India serves as the Head of the institution.

History
The demand for the establishment of a National Law University was the oldest among all national level institutions like IIM, IIIT, AIIMS, and NIPER in Vidarbha which is considered as a backward region of Maharashtra. Nagpur was the first to be tipped to get the State's First National Law University when its demand was endorsed by dignitaries which included Then-President Pratibha Patil, Chief Justice Mohit Shah and then Chief Minister Prithviraj Chavan during High Court Bar Association's (HCBA) Platinum Jubilee celebrations in February 2011. But due to some unidentified reasons, the proposal failed to move further. Ex-High Court Bar Association President Mr. Anil Mardikar first raised the demand on February 6, 2011 for an NLU in Nagpur. But The Maharashtra Government shifted The Institute to Mumbai as revealed by then Minister Of State DP Sawant. The High Court Bar Association of Nagpur and District Bar Association of Nagpur staged protests and even filed a PIL in Nagpur High Court against this move. The Government was forced to allow the establishment of an NLU in Nagpur. The Bill to govern NLUs was tabled in the Nagpur session of the assembly in 2013 for the first time.  The State Assembly passed the Maharashtra National Law University Act (Maharashtra Act No. VI of 2014) paving way for the establishment of The Institution. The Chief Justice of India appointed Justice Sharad Bobde as the first Chancellor for MNLU Nagpur and District judge Dr. N.M Sakharkar was appointed as the Officer On Special Duty (OSD) and the Registrar of the university.

Academics and research 
The university has twenty-eight centres for advanced legal studies and research to address the socio-legal issues and challenges and to conduct research on thriving issues of law, social science and humanities. These centres offer courses, conduct seminars, conferences, and training programs for the identified target groups.

The prominent research centres are

 Centre for Advanced Study in Criminal Law (CASCL)
 Centre for Consumer Protection Laws and Advocacy (CCPLA)
 Centre for Advanced Study in International Humanitarian Law (CASH)
 Centre for Study in Agriculture Law and Economics (SALE)
 Bureau of Information for Studies Abroad (BISA)
 Directorate of Distance Education (DODE)
 Centre for Advanced Studies in Human Rights (CASIHR)
 Centre for Woman and Child Rights
 Centre of Intellectual Property Law (IPR) [In collaboration with the World Intellectual Property Organisation( WIPO)]
 Centre for Legal Aid and Services
 Centre for Alternative Dispute Resolution

The university has inked Memorandum of Understanding (MoU) with prominent law universities of the country for the purpose of academic collaboration that will encompass exchange of students and members of faculty between the two universities, etc. The university has inked MoUs and collaborations with the following institutions

 National Law School of India University, Bangalore;
 National Law University, Delhi;
 Rajiv Gandhi National University of Law, Punjab;
 The Tata Institute of Social Sciences, Mumbai, Mumbai;
 Gujarat National Law University, Gandhinagar;
 National Law University and Judicial Academy, Assam;
 Maharashtra National Law University, Aurangabad.

Library
The university's library has physical copies of over 35,000 legal titles. It has received various donations prominently from Bombay High Court Library (Nagpur Bench) for its development. The university also has access to various physical and virtual legal databases.

Activities
The university offers B.A.LL.B. (Hons.) Five-Year Integrated Degree Programme [120 seats], B.A.LL.B. (Hons.) in Adjudication and Justicing Five-Year Integrated Degree Programme [60 seats], B.B.A.L.L.B (Hons.) Five-Year Integrated Degree Programme [60 seats], One-Year LL.M. Postgraduate Degree Programme, Doctor of law (Ph.D.) Programme, Short-term diplomas and certificate courses in law The university also hosts cultural fest sanskrotsav and annual Intra sport event sportacus.

Publications

 MNLU Contemporary Law Review (CLR)
 MNLU Student Law Review
 MNLU Journal of Social Sciences
 MNLU Journal on International Law
 MNLU Journal on Taxation Laws
 MNLU Journal on Arbitration
 MNLU Journal of law and economics

Admissions 
The admissions to the university are done on merit ranking based on the Common Law Admission Test (CLAT) of India which is a centralized test for admission to 21 National Law Universities in India. The eligibility is as per the CLAT Notification. The acceptance rate is less than five percent with sixty thousand applicants applying for 120 seats as of 2018.

A separate admission process including group discussion and personal interview is carried out for selecting students for The B.A.LL.B. (Hons.) in Adjudication and Justicing Programme which is a Five-Year Integrated Degree Course.

Affiliations
MNLU Nagpur is recognized by the Bar Council of India and the University Grants Commission (UGC) as a state university. The Bombay High Court (Nagpur Bench) serves as the governing institution of the university.

Memberships

MNLU is a member and has a technical association with

 Asian Law Institute (ASLI), Singapore
 Commonwealth Legal Education Association (CLEA)
 Forum of South Asian Clinical Law Teachers (FSACLT), Goa
 Indian Economic Association (IEA);
 Indian Institute of Comparative Law (IICL), Jaipur
 Indian Institute of Public Administration (IIPA), New Delhi
 Indian Law Institute (ILI), New Delhi
 Indian Political Science Association (IPSA)
 Indian Society of Criminology (ISC), Madras;
 Indian Society of International Law (ISIL), New Delhi
 Institute of Constitutional and Parliamentary Studies (ICPS), New Delhi
 International Association of Law Schools (IALS)
 International Law Students Association (ILSA), USA
 Legal Information Institute of India (LII of India)
 Shastri Indo-Canadian Institute (SICI)
 National Academy of Direct Taxes, Nagpur
 The Institute of Military Law, Nagpur

Governing council

The Governing Council of the university is as follows

 Hon’ble Justice Sharad Arvind Bobde, Chief Justice, Supreme Court of India- Chancellor
 Hon'ble Justice Pradeep Nandrajog, Chief Justice of High Court of Bombay- Pro-Chancellor
 Prof. (Dr.) Vijender Kumar, Vice-Chancellor
 Shri K.K. Venugopal, Attorney General of India
 Hon’ble Justice B. R. Gavai, Judge, Supreme Court of India
 Hon’ble Minister for Higher Education, State of Maharashtra
 Hon’ble Minister for Law, State of Maharashtra
 Advocate General of Maharashtra
 Shri Jayant D. Jaibhave, Nominee of Bar Council of India
 Chairman Bar Council of Maharashtra
 Principal Secretary, Higher and Technical Education Department, Government of Maharashtra
 Hon’ble Justice V S Sirpurkar, Former Judge, Supreme Court of India
 Dr. Prakash Amte, Social Worker
 Hon’ble Justice R. C. Chavan, Former Judge, Bombay High Court
 Prof. (Dr.) Parmjit S. Jaswal, Vice-Chancellor, RGNUL Patiala, Punjab

Academic council

The academic council of the university consists of the following-

 Prof.(Dr.) Vijender Kumar, Vice-Chancellor, NLU, Nagpur - Chairman
 Dr Raghunath Anant Mashelkar, National Research Professor, National Chemical Laboratory, Pune
 Shri Kailash Satyarthi, Nobel Laureate, Kailash Satyarthi Children's Foundation, New Delhi
 Hon’ble Justice G. Raghuram, Former Judge, Andhra Pradesh High Court, Hyderabad
 Nominee of the State Government of Maharashtra
 Shri Manan Kumar Mishra, Sr. Advocate and chairman, Bar Council of India, New Delhi
 Dr Himanshu Pandey, associate professor of law, Head Centre for Corporate Law and Governance, MNLU, Nagpur
 Registrar, ex-officio Secretary

Campus 
The university's main campus is under construction and is coming up at a cost of 750 crores sanctioned by the Government of Maharashtra. The Ground-breaking ceremony for the campus was performed by Ranjan Gogoi, Chief Justice of India; Nitin Gadkari, Union Minister, Devendra Fadnavis, Chief Minister of Maharashtra; Justice Sharad Bobde, Judge, Supreme court; Justice Bhushan Gavai, Supreme Court; Justice N V Ramana, Judge, Supreme Court; Justice Pradeep Nandrajog, Chief Justice of High Court of Bombay and Pro-Chancellor of the university, Vinod Tawde, Minister of Higher and Technical Education of Maharashtra; Sudhir Mungantiwar, Minister of Finance and Chandrashekhar Bawankule, Guardian Minister of Maharashtra

The new building would be a completely green one with state-of-art facilities for  students and staff with GRIHA Certification. It would have a ‘Museum Of Law’ along with a health and wellness centre to help nearby villagers. The campus will follow Indian Green Building Council (IGBC) norms. It will have solar panels to produce energy, and food would be cooked on it. All classrooms will be embedded with information and communication technology. The first phase of the construction has been done. Construction of the second and third phase of the campus is expected to complete to soon.

References

External links
 Official website

Universities and colleges in Nagpur
2016 establishments in Maharashtra
Educational institutions established in 2008
Law schools in Maharashtra
2008 establishments in Maharashtra
National Law Universities